Liam King may refer to:

 Liam King (footballer) (born 1987), English footballer
 Liam King (hurler) (born 1940), Irish retired hurler